Jill Parker-Hammersley-Shirley is a former female table tennis player from England.

Table tennis
From 1972 to 1982 she won several medals in singles, doubles, and team events in the Table Tennis European Championships and in the World Table Tennis Championships She was ranked number one in England during the early 1970s.

She also won four English Open titles.

Personal life
She changed her name from Jill Shirley to Jill Hammersley after marrying Nicky Hammersley on 3 July 1970. She later married fellow England international Donald Parker and they had two children. Their daughter Katy Parker represented England at the 2002 Commonwealth Games in the table tennis mixed doubles and their son Adam was a semi-professional cricketer.

See also
 List of table tennis players
 List of England players at the World Team Table Tennis Championships

References

English female table tennis players
Living people
Year of birth missing (living people)